Aminu Bello Masari  (born 29 May 1950) is a Nigerian politician and current Governor of Katsina State. He was the Commissioner for works, housing and transport Katsina state from 1991 to 1993. He was the speaker of the Nigerian House of Representatives between 2003 and 2007. Masari hails from Masari village of ƙafur local government, Katsina State.

Political career
Masari contested for the office of Katsina State Governor in the 2011 election under the platform of defunct Congress for Progressive Change. He lost the Election to PDP's Ibrahim Shehu Shema.

In December 2014 he emerged as the governorship candidate of the All Progressives Congress for the March 2015 elections.

Aminu Bello was declared winner of the 11 April 2015 Katsina State Governorship election, defeating  Musa Nashuni. Dikko Umaru Raɗɗa

Aminu Bello Masari was sworn in as the Executive Governor of Katsina State on 29 May 2015.

Immediately after his inauguration, amid financial recession in the country, Governor Masari accused his predecessor of literally stealing the state treasury after 2015 elections and a few days to handing power to his new government. This accusation along with similar financial cases amounting to N11 billion compelled EFCC to invite and later charge Barrister Shema to court along with some of his cabinet members. Governor Masari  also dissolved local government chairmen who were all from the ousted party. On its part, PDP challenged the state in court for dissolving democratically elected local government chairmen.

Aminu Bello Masari was elected for a second term as Governor of Katsina in the March 9, 2019 Katsina State gubernatorial election under the platform of All Progressives Congress having polled 1, 178, 864 votes against Peoples Democratic Party's Senator Garba Yakubu Lado who had 488, 621 votes.

See also 
List of Governors of Katsina State 
Katsina State Executive Council

References

Speakers of the House of Representatives (Nigeria)
1950 births
Living people
Nigerian Muslims
Place of birth missing (living people)
All Progressives Congress politicians
Politicians from Katsina
People from Katsina State
Peoples Democratic Party members of the House of Representatives (Nigeria)